Natalie Okri is a British singer and songwriter. She rose to prominence in 2009 after her performance at Britain’s Got Talent.

Born Natalie Tafadzwanashe Okri in November 1998 in London, United Kingdom, she grew up in Deptford, London where she had her early education. She is niece to Ben Okri and Mike Okri. Natalie has been singing since age 4. At Britain's Got Talent (series 3), Natalie reached the semi-finals, she was aged 10 years old and her performance is the 6th most watched audition of all time on YouTube with over 127 million views on which she sang No One by Alicia Keys. In 2009, The Telegraph reported that Natalie was bullied at school after her performance on television.

In 2010, Natalie signed to Syco Entertainment, Simon Cowell`s recording label but left in 2012.

Discography
Don't you dare 2017
No haters feat. Kadle 2017
Needy feat. Weliwayo Boyz 2017
Make up 2019
Get it 2020
Quarantine thoughts 2020
Like that 2020
Cheat 2020
Slow and steady 2021
Roll with me 2021 (Remix feat. Ramz (rapper) and Sneakbo 2021)
Girls just wanna have fun 2022
Readyo 2022

References

Living people
Britain's Got Talent contestants
1998 births